Odimba Otshudi Lamá (born 15 January 1985) better known as Lamá is a Mozambican goalkeeper with the Mozambique national football team.

He was called up for the 2010 African Cup of Nations tournament.

References

1985 births
Living people
Mozambican footballers
Mozambique international footballers
Association football goalkeepers
Liga Desportiva de Maputo players
Clube Ferroviário de Maputo footballers
CD Costa do Sol players
Clube Ferroviário de Nacala players
2010 Africa Cup of Nations players